In mathematics, a classifying topos for some sort of structure is a topos T such that there is a natural equivalence between geometric morphisms from a cocomplete topos E to T and the category of models for the structure in E.

Examples

The classifying topos for objects of a topos is the topos of presheaves over the opposite of the category of finite sets. 
The classifying topos for rings of a topos is the topos of presheaves over the opposite of the category of finitely presented rings. 
The classifying topos for local rings of a topos is the topos of sheaves over the opposite of the category of finitely presented rings with the Zariski topology. 
The classifying topos for linear orders with distinct largest and smallest elements of a topos is the topos of simplicial sets.
If G is a discrete group, the classifying topos for G-torsors over a topos is the topos BG of G-sets.
The classifying space of topological groups in homotopy theory.

References

External links

 

Topos theory